William Madison Wood (June 18, 1858 – February 2, 1926) was an American textile mill owner of Lawrence, Massachusetts who was considered to be an expert in efficiency. He made a good deal of his fortune through being hired by mill owners to turn around failing mills and was despised by organized labor.

Early life 
William Wood was born in 1858 in a cottage on Pease Point Way, in Edgartown, Massachusetts, on the island of Martha's Vineyard. His parents, Grace (Emma) Wood and William Wood Sr., were Portuguese immigrants from the Azores. His father, William Sr., Guilherme Medeiros Silva was a crewman on a New Bedford whaling ship from 1853 until his death in 1871.  (The Portuguese word "silva" translates into English as "wood" or "forest".)  William Jr. was only 12 years old when his father died, and had to drop out of school and find a job to provide for his mother and younger siblings. Fortunately for William Wood, Andrew G. Pierce, a wealthy New Bedford textile manufacturer, offered him a job working in his Wamsutta Cotton Mill.  Pierce would soon see that hiring young William would prove to be extremely beneficial.  Pierce was impressed with Wood's work and promoted him to the manufacturing department, where he learned cost structures and figures. At the age of eighteen, Wood left New Bedford for Philadelphia.  With the help of Andrew Pierce, William was able to find a good job with a Philadelphia brokerage firm.  This is where he learned about stocks and bonds.  After tiring of Philadelphia, he returned to New Bedford and worked at a bank.  According to the Dukes County Intelligencer, when a Fall River textile company went bankrupt, its new manager hired William as paymaster. Then in 1885, the Washington Mill in Lawrence went bankrupt and was purchased by Frederick Ayer of Lowell. Frederick Ayer and his brother James Cook Ayer were successful patent medicine producers.

American Woolen Company 

Ayer was a multi-millionaire but knew nothing about the textile industry.  This is when Ayer's new manager convinced Wood to leave his previous position and be his assistant in charge of manufacturing.  A short time later, Wood was promoted to treasurer, and four years later he was made manager. Wood was then making a substantial amount of money for the time, around $25,000 a year. Within three years of his promotion, William Wood married Ayer's daughter Ellen (eventually making him a brother-in-law to General George S. Patton) in 1888. Ellen was well educated; she studied at a finishing school in France and then attended Radcliffe College in Cambridge, MA.  Wood was determined to make the Washington Mill a success for himself and his newly acquired family.  Wood did make the Washington Mill a success and decided to move on to bigger goals.  He set out to merge some of the small, struggling mills of New England into one mammoth money-making company, his company. By 1899, William Wood had convinced seven such mills to join what he called "The Woolen Trust". In April of that same year the company was incorporated under a new name, the American Woolen Company.  Frederick Ayer bought half of the shares, and Wood purchased the rest.

Lawrence textile strike 

In 1912, the Lawrence Mill workers, organized and backed by the union, IWW, went on strike. William Wood was required to shorten the work week for all employees. He did cut the work week from fifty-six hours to fifty-four hours, but he also increased the speed at which the looms ran in order to keep from losing profits.  The workers were angry that they were working just as hard and producing just as much as they would in a fifty-six-hour week, but only getting paid for fifty-four hours.

During the strike, the police found explosives in three different places along the mills. Meanwhile, Wood settled with the strikers, giving them time and a quarter for overtime and thirty cents more a week to piece-workers.  The problem was solved for the moment, but the authorities were looking into the explosives. Eventually, by tracing the serial numbers on the dynamite, the authorities received a confession from the mill contractor, Ernest Pittman.  He told them that he and another man, John Breen, had planted the explosives to implicate the IWW.  Since they were both employed by William Wood, Wood was indicted for conspiracy to destroy the mills.  After a long trial, the grand jury found William Wood not guilty on June 6, 1913.

Later in life 
Moving on with his life, William made big plans for his company's headquarters at Shawsheen Village, Massachusetts. This meant moving from the previous location in Lawrence.  The entire project took about five years from 1918 to 1923. Wood transformed a quiet residential community into a self-sufficient neighborhood for his employees; it included industrial, residential and recreational facilities. During those years, the First World War kept the woolen industry alive.  Wood was swamped with Army contracts that helped his company grow. By 1924, the company owned sixty mills and employed over 40,000 people. In 1924, William Wood suffered a stroke.  His doctor advised him to retire and rest.  Taking his doctors advice, William Wood retired and named Andrew Pierce Jr. his successor.  Pierce Jr. was the son of the man who gave Wood his first job.  In January 1926, he and his wife Ellen moved to Florida. He committed suicide in  Daytona Beach on February 2, 1926.

After Wood's death, his fortune became the subject of a major U.S. Supreme Court decision on the interpretation of the income tax laws.  In the case of Old Colony Trust Co. v. Commissioner, 279 U.S. 716 (1929), Chief Justice William Howard Taft held that where a third party (in this case, American Woolen Co.) pays the income tax owed by an individual, the amount of tax paid constitutes additional taxable income to that individual.  The executors of his will therefore had to pay the back taxes on his estate.

Sports owner 
Wood owned the Shawsheen Indians which won the 1924–25 National Challenge Cup.  In June 1925, the Indians entered the American Soccer League.  Following Wood's death, the Indians withdrew from the league and folded.

See also 
 Cuttyhunk - Wood and family had two homes on the island now known as Avalon and Winter House.

References

External links 
William Madison Wood and the Lost Masterpiece of Sculptor Bryant Baker

1858 births
1926 suicides
People from Lawrence, Massachusetts
People from Edgartown, Massachusetts
People of the Industrial Revolution
American textile industry businesspeople
American people of Azorean descent
American soccer chairmen and investors
Suicides by firearm in Florida
Businesspeople from Massachusetts
American Woolen Company
People from Cuttyhunk Island
People from Andover, Massachusetts